The 2020 SMP Russian Circuit Racing Series was the seventh season of the Russian Circuit Racing Series, organized by SMP Racing. It was the sixth season with TCR class cars. In 2020, the GT4 and CN classes were added to the main Touring, Touring Light, Super Production and S1600 classes.

Kiril Ladygin won the Russian Touring Car Championship, driving a Lada Vesta Sport TCR. Lada Sport Rosneft clinched the teams' title. Vladislav Nezvankin won the Super Production class, driving a Lada Vesta. Vladimir Sheshenin won the Touring Light class, driving a Lada Granta. Petr Plotnikov won the S1600 class, while Egor Fokin won the S1600 Junior; they were both driving a Volkswagen Polo Sedan. Denis Remenyako with Capital Racing Team won the GT4 class, driving a Mercedes-AMG GT4.

Teams and drivers
Yokohama was the official tyre supplier.

Touring / TCR Russian Touring Car Championship
All teams were Russian-registered.

Super Production
All teams and drivers are Russian-registered.

Touring-Light
All teams and drivers are Russian-registered.

S1600
All teams and drivers are Russian-registered, with the exception of the Belarusian racer Alexei Savin..

S1600 Junior
All teams and drivers are Russian-registered.

GT4
All teams and drivers are Russian-registered.

Sports prototype CN
All teams and drivers are Russian-registered.

Calendar and results
The 2020 schedule was announced on 28 November 2019, with all events scheduled to be held in Russia. After the restrictions caused by the COVID-19 pandemic, on June 22, an updated calendar of SMP RCRS 2020 is presented.

Championship standings

Scoring systems

Touring / TCR Russian Touring Car Championship

† – Drivers did not finish the race, but were classified as they completed over 75% of the race distance.

Touring / TCR Russian Touring Car Championship Team's Standings

Super Production

† – Drivers did not finish the race, but were classified as they completed over 75% of the race distance.

Super Production Team's Standings

Touring Light

† – Drivers did not finish the race, but were classified as they completed over 75% of the race distance.

Touring Light Team's Standings

S1600

† – Drivers did not finish the race, but were classified as they completed over 75% of the race distance.

S1600 Team's Standings

S1600 Junior

† – Drivers did not finish the race, but were classified as they completed over 75% of the race distance.

S1600 Junior Team's Standings

GT4

† – Drivers did not finish the race, but were classified as they completed over 75% of the race distance.

GT4 Team's Standings

Footnotes

References

External links
 

Russian Circuit Racing Series
Russian Circuit Racing Series
Russian Circuit Racing Series